Austin and Paley was the title of a practice of architects in Lancaster, Lancashire, England, in the first half of the 20th century.  The practice was founded in 1836 by Edmund Sharpe.  Between 1895 and 1914 the partners had been Hubert Austin and Henry Paley.  Henry Paley had joined the practice as a partner in 1886 when his father, E. G. Paley, was Austin's partner ; the practice then became known as Paley, Austin and Paley.  E. G. Paley died in 1895 and the practice continued under the title of Austin and Paley.  Austin's son, Geoffrey, joined the practice as a partner in 1914 and for a short time the practice was known as Austin, Paley and Austin.  Hubert Austin died in 1915. Geoffrey Austin was on active service during the First World War and did not return to the practice, so Henry Paley continued the business of the firm as the sole partner from this time.  For a time the practice continued with the title of Austin, Paley and Austin but around 1925 it reverted to the title of Austin and Paley.  Henry Paley retired in 1936 but some work continued to be done by the practice until at least 1942; it was finally wound up around 1944.

This list covers the ecclesiastical works executed by the practice after 1916.  These works include new churches, restorations and alterations of older churches, additions to churches, and church fittings and furniture.  The practice designed about 10 new churches and restored or modified many more.  Because of the location of the practice, most of their ecclesiastical work was in the areas that are now Cumbria, Lancashire, and Greater Manchester, but examples can also be found in Cheshire, North Yorkshire, Staffordshire, Nottinghamshire, and the West Midlands.

Key

Works

See also
 Lists of works by Sharpe, Paley and Austin

References
Citations

Sources

 

 

Gothic Revival architecture
Austin and Paley